Paudie Kissane (born 1 March 1980) is an Irish Gaelic footballer who played as a left wing-back for the Cork senior team.

Born in Whitechurch, County Cork, Kissane arrived on the inter-county scene at the age of eighteen when he first linked up with the Cork minor team, before later joining the under-21 and junior sides. He made his debut in the 2002 National Football League. Kissane went on to play a key part on and off the team for over a decade, and won one All-Ireland medal, two Munster medals and three National Football League medals. He was an All-Ireland runner-up on one occasion.

Kissane represented the Munster inter-provincial team on a number of occasions throughout his career. At club level he began his career with Whitechurch before later winning a premier intermediate championship medal with Clyda Rovers.

Throughout his career, Kissane made 24 championship appearances for Cork. He announced his retirement from inter-county football on 30 October 2013.

In retirement from play Kissane immediately became involved in coaching and team management. He served a one-year stint as coach to the senior Clare county team.

Honours
Clyda Rovers
Cork Premier Intermediate Football Championship (1): 2013
Munster Intermediate Club Football Championship (1): 2013

Cork
All-Ireland Senior Football Championship (1): 2010
Munster Senior Football Championship (2): 2009, 2012
National Football League (3): 2010, 2011, 2012
All-Ireland Junior Football Championship (1): 2007
Munster Junior Football Championship (1): 2007

References

1980 births
Living people
Clare county football team
Clyda Rovers Gaelic footballers
Cork inter-county Gaelic footballers
Gaelic football backs
Gaelic football coaches
London Gaelic footballers
Tír Chonaill Gaels Gaelic footballers
Winners of one All-Ireland medal (Gaelic football)